Tiruppur or Tirupur is a city in the Indian state of Tamil Nadu. Tiruppur is the administrative headquarters of Tiruppur district and the fifth largest city as well as an urban agglomeration in Tamil Nadu. Located on the banks of Noyyal River, it has been ruled at different times, by the Early Pandyas, Medieval Cholas, Later Cholas,  Mysore Kingdom and the British.

Tiruppur is administered by municipal corporation which was established in 2008 and the total area of the corporation is 159.6 km2 divided into 60 wards. The total population of the city as per the 2011 census is 877,778. Tiruppur is a part of the Tiruppur constituency that elects its member of parliament.

Tiruppur is a major textile and knit wear hub contributing to 90% of total cotton knit wear exports from India. The textile industry provides employment to over six lakh people and contributed to exports worth  in 2014–15.

Etymology
The name Tiruppur is said to have emerged during the Mahabharata era. According to legends, the cattle herds of Pandavas were stolen by thieves and the same was recaptured by Arjuna's forces resulting in the name "Thiruppur" (Thiruppu meaning "to turn" and oor meaning "a place" in Tamil) meaning "place where they were returned".

History
Tiruppur formed a part of the Kongu Nadu region ruled by the Cheras during Sangam period. The region was part of a prominent Roman trade route that connected east and west coasts of India. The medieval Cholas conquered the Kongu Nadu in the tenth century CE and Chola stone carvings mention Kanchi Maanadhi (Noyyal River) and the fertile sand that it deposited on its banks.

The region came under the rule of the Vijayanagara Empire by the 15th century and later Palayakkarars, the chieftains of Madurai Nayaks ruled the region. In the later part of the 18th century, the region came under the Kingdom of Mysore, following a series of wars with the Madurai Nayak Dynasty. After the defeat of Tipu Sultan in the Anglo-Mysore Wars, the British East India Company annexed the region into the Madras Presidency in 1799.

Tiruppur was an agricultural town with irrigated farms and the farmers became small owners of various textile related units during the 1970s. The boom in the textile industry led to an inter woven network of the small scale units leading to growth of the city into a major textile hub. Tiruppur became a municipal corporation in 2008 and a separate Tiruppur district was carved out from parts of Coimbatore district and Erode district in 2009.

Geography

Demographics

According to 2011 census, Tiruppur had a population of 444,352 with a sex-ratio of 955 females for every 1,000 males, much above the national average of 929. A total of 48,802 were under the age of six, constituting 24,818 males and 23,984 females. Scheduled Castes and Scheduled Tribes accounted for 5.47% and 0.06% of the population, respectively. The average literacy of the city was 78.17%, compared to the national average of 72.99%. The city had a total of 124,617 households. There were a total of 207,358 workers, comprising 490 cultivators, 721 main agricultural labourers, 3,492 in house hold industries, 191,882 other workers, 10,773 marginal workers, 89 marginal cultivators, 74 marginal agricultural labourers, 470 marginal workers in household industries and 10,140 other marginal workers. The area of Tiruppur was expanded in 2011 and the population was 877,778 as per the revised estimate.

As per the religious census of 2011, Tiruppur (M Corp.) had 86.05% Hindus, 10.36% Muslims, 3.33% Christians, 0.03% Sikhs, 0.01% Buddhists, 0.07% Jains, 0.14% following other religions and 0.01% following no religion or did not indicate any religious preference.

Climate
The summer occurs during the months March, April and May when the weather is hot and dry. The monsoon months are the months of June, July and August. These months are mainly characterised by mild showers and a reduced temperature. The post monsoon or winter months are September, October, November, December and January.

Due to the presence of the Palghat gap, the city receives some rainfall from the south-west monsoon from June to August. After a humid September, the north-east monsoon brings rains from October which lasts till early December. The soil is predominantly black, which is suitable for cotton cultivation, but Tiruppur district also has some red loamy soil. Tiruppur falls under the Class III/IV seismic zone, having experienced a 6.0 Richter scale earthquake in 1900.

Administration and politics

Tiruppur city is administered by Tiruppur Municipal Corporation headed by a mayor. Tiruppur Municipality was established in 1917 and was upgraded to a municipal corporation in 2008. The city is divided into 60 wards. Each ward is represented by a councillor who is elected by direct election and the mayor of Tiruppur is elected by councillors. The executive wing of the corporation is headed by a corporation commissioner and maintains basic services like water supply, sewage and roads. Law and order is maintained by Tiruppur police headed by a police commissioner who is equivalent to the rank of IGP (Inspector General Of Police ). The city police has seven police stations, three traffic police stations and over 1,000 personnel. The Tiruppur District Court is the ultimate judicial authority in the district.

Thiruppur has two assembly constituencies Tiruppur North and Tiruppur South. Tiruppur is part of Tiruppur Lok Sabha constituency which was created during the delimination in 2008 consisting parts of erstwhile Coimbatore, Gobichettipalayam and Palani constituencies.

Economy
Tiruppur is also known as the knitwear capital of India, accounting for 90% of India's cotton knitwear export. It has spurred up the textile industry in India for the past three decades. It contributes to a huge amount of foreign exchange in India. In the fiscal year 2013, exports were  17,500 crores. The city provides employment for many workers, with the average salary per worker being around  9,000 per month.

There are over 10,000 garment manufacturing industries in Tiruppur, employing over 600,000 people. The cluster on an average exports textiles worth ₹ 25 billion a month. Cotton knitwear sent from here are in much demand in European countries.

Special industrial parks have been developed to support the textile industry. Nethaji Apparel Park, Thirupur Export Knitwear Industrial Complex, SIDCO Industrial Estate and J.S.Apparel Park are a few that are operational. Nethaji Apparel Park has 53 companies manufacturing knitwear for exports. The NAP presently provides employment to 15,000 people and generates export revenue of ₹ 15 billion from the apparel produced in it. Tirupur Export Knitwear Industrial Complex was established in 1992 and has 189 sheds built over a 4200 square feet area. Some of the world's largest retailers including C&A, Nike, Walmart, Primark, Adidas, Switcher, Polo Ralph Lauren, Diesel, Tommy Hilfiger, M&S, FILA, H&M, and Reebok import textiles and clothing from Tiruppur.

Apart from knitwear production units, Tiruppur is famous for the  production of brass, copper, and aluminium utensils for kitchen and hotel needs. Anupparpalayam locality in Tiruppur has been involved in this business. Manufactured products are supplied throughout Tamil Nadu and the nearby states of Andhra Pradesh, Pondicherry, Karnataka and Kerala. Tiruppur is one of the fastest-growing cities in India, with a rate of 8.36 per year.

Welfare
Tiruppur has a good educational infrastructure. The city itself has only a few engineering colleges, but the proximal areas and nearby cities of Coimbatore and Erode augurs well. There are 7 government hospitals at the taluk level with a total number of 896 beds and a total of 43 primary health centers in the rural areas

Environmental issues
Tiruppur, like any other industrial town, faces its share of environmental pollution complaints. As per the directive of Madras High Court, zero liquid discharge (ZLD) should be strictly followed in Tiruppur knitwear cluster during the effluent treatment process. Failure to implement this order, led to a court ordered closure of all dyeing units and bleaching units. In turn, Tirupur Exporters Association made a representation to the Government that export revenues of  11 billion were lost and about 100,000 labourers lost their job due to a closure of dyeing units in Tirupur.

As per a report by CRISIL, prepared in February 2011, ensuring Zero Liquid Discharge (ZLD), will primarily affect the operational costs of dyeing and bleaching units, increasing it by 7% to 10%. Eventually, by complying with the above order, Tiruppur became the first textile cluster in India to achieve Zero Liquid Discharge in their units. Both the Common Effluent Treatment Plant and Individual Effluent Treatment Plant are in place to treat effluents. Farmers in Tiruppur and its hinterland, who have faced the brunt of the indiscriminate discharge of industrial effluents into the water bodies for the past many decades, are yet again becoming concerned. Untreated effluents, mostly containing dyes and chemicals in high concentration, are now seen let off clandestinely once again in large quantities through storm water drains into water bodies or into open areas with the discharge mostly happening during the early morning hours or during rain.

Transport
The following major highways serve Tiruppur:
NH-381: Avinashi - Tiruppur - Avinashipalayam
SH-19: Palladam - Tiruppur - Kamanaicken Palayam via Pollachi
SH-37: Avinashipalayam - Dharapuram
SH-196 / SH-81:  Tiruppur - Gobichettipalayam
SH-169: Tiruppur - Somanur
SH-172: Tiruppur - Kangeyam - Vellakovil

Tirupur Has Three Main Bus Stands
New,Old,Kovilvazhi Bus Stands

New Bus Stand : Trichy, Thanjavur, Karur, Coimbatore (Via Avinashi), Mettupalayam, Ooty, Gobichettipalayam, Sathyamangalam etc

Old Bus Stand : Coimbatore(Via Palladam), Dharapuram, Pollachi, Palani, Erode, Udumalaipettai, Salem etc

Kovilvazhi Bus Stand :(Via Dharapuram, Oddanchatram) Madurai, Dindigul, Theni, Tirunelveli 

Tiruppur is well connected by Moffusil bus services to all major towns and cities across Tamil Nadu, Kerala, Karnataka and Andhra Pradesh. The city has two major bus stands, viz., Old Bus stand and New Bus stand.

The nearest airport is Coimbatore International Airport (45 km) which has regular flights from/to various domestic destinations like Ahmedabad, Bangalore, Bhubaneswar, Chennai, Delhi, Hyderabad, Visakhapatnam, Tirupati, Kolkata, Kozhikode, Mumbai, Pune and international destinations such as Sharjah, Colombo and Singapore. The Tiruppur railway station falls on the fully electrified and double tracked Erode - Coimbatore  broad gauge line and is well connected by trains.

Places of interest

Major temples in Tiruppur were built during the reign of Cholas and Pandyas. Sukreeswarar Temple, is a tenth-century temple situated at the outskirts of Tiruppur is considered one of the four Sirpa Sthalangal in Kongu region. An epigraphic study conducted at the temple reported that though the temple was built by the Pandyas, the place was used by tribals to offer poojas to Shivalingam as early as the fifth century. Some of the popular tourist locations outside the city are Sivanmalai, Thirumoorthy Hills, Amaravathi Crocodile Farm, Orathuppalayam Dam, Nanjarayan Tank, Koolipalayam wetlands, Andipalayam lake, Thirumurugan poondi, Konganagiri hill hock temple, Tiruppur Thirupathi temple, Avinashilingeshwarar temple and Vazhai Thottathu Ayyankovil.

The Town Hall, new railway over-bridge, Tiruppur Kumaran memorial, corporation memorial pillar are some of the landmarks in the Tiruppur city.

Notable people

 Dharun Ayyasamy, athlete currently holds the national record in 400m  hurdles
 S. Theodore Baskaran, film historian and wildlife conservationist
 T. A. Ramalingam Chettiar, Indian lawyer, politician, member of parliament and businessman
 Udumalai Narayana Kavi, poet and lyricist
 Tiruppur Kumaran, freedom fighter
 T. S. Avinashilingam Chettiar, Indian lawyer, politician, freedom-fighter and Gandhian
 Best Ramasamy,  politician and entrepreneur from the Indian state of Tamil Nadu

References

External links

 
Cities and towns in Tiruppur district
Textile industry in Tamil Nadu